Gettin' Down to It is the 24th studio album by American musician James Brown. The album was released in May 1969, by King Records. A pet project of Brown's, the album consists of standards sung in the jazz ballad style of Frank Sinatra, whom Brown greatly admired. In addition, two of Brown's own compositions, "Cold Sweat" and an instrumental version of "There Was a Time", are included, reinterpreted in the same style.

Robert Christgau has called it "a ballad album that could scare the shades off Ray Charles".

Track listing

Personnel
James Brown – vocals and producer
Dee Felice Trio:
Frank Vincent – piano
Lee Tucker – bass
Dee Felice – drums

References

1969 albums
James Brown albums
Albums produced by James Brown
King Records (United States) albums